Pages Creek, a mostly perennial stream of the Hunter River catchment, is located in the Hunter region of New South Wales, Australia.

Course
Officially designated as a river, the Pages Creek rises on the southern slopes of the Great Dividing Range near Ben Halls Gap. Pages Creek descends  over its  course.

See also

 List of rivers of Australia
 List of rivers of New South Wales (L-Z)
 Rivers of New South Wales

References

External links
 

 

Rivers of the Hunter Region
Upper Hunter Shire
Hunter River (New South Wales)